Betz Airport (FAA LID: 44G) is a privately-owned, public-use located two miles north of Blissfield, Michigan, United States, in Blissfield Township. It is at an elevation of 691 feet.

The airport has one runway, designated 9/27. It measures 2,602 x  92 ft (793 x 28 m)  and has a turf surface.

No fuel is available at the airport.

For the 12-month period ending December 31, 2021, the airport had 696 aircraft operations, an average of 58 per month. This was composed entirely of general aviation. There are 9 aircraft based on the airport, all single-engine airplanes.

References

Airports in Michigan
Airports in Lenawee County, Michigan